Erna Fentsch (21 April 1909 – 26 November 1997) was a German actress and screenwriter. She appeared 18 films between 1932 and 1944.

Selected filmography

 A Man with Heart (1932)
 The Tunnel (1933)
 The Champion of Pontresina (1934)
 Marriage Strike (1935)
 The Monastery's Hunter (1935)
 The Unsuspecting Angel (1936)
 Under Blazing Heavens (1936)
 The Sinful Village (1940)
 The White Hell of Pitz Palu (1950)
 The Exchange (1952)
 Have Sunshine in Your Heart (1953)
 The Confession of Ina Kahr (1954)
 Crown Prince Rudolph's Last Love (1955)
 Sebastian Kneipp (1958)

References

External links

1909 births
1997 deaths
German film actresses
German women screenwriters
20th-century German actresses
Actresses from Munich
Film people from Munich
20th-century German screenwriters